Felix Coetzee (born 7 March 1959 in Durban, Natal Province, Union of South Africa) is a South African three-time champion jockey in thoroughbred horse racing.

Felix Coetzee is the son of a KwaZulu-Natal trainer and his grandfather was an owner-trainer. As a fifteen-year-old, Felix Coetzee attended the Jockey Academy at Summerveld then served his apprenticeship with his father's racing stable. At age sixteen, he scored his first significant win, riding Kentford to victory in the 1975 Clairwood Winter Handicap. In 1982 he signed on with renowned Cape Town trainer Terence M. Millard with whom he was associated until his retirement in 1991.

Career 

During his career, Felix Coetzee has led all South African jockeys in wins three times and has won numerous important South African races. At Greyville Racecourse, he won the country's premier race, the Rothmans July Handicap three times, and the Gold Cup a record-equaling seven times. Coetzee is also a five-time winner of the J&B Metropolitan Stakes at Kenilworth Racecourse.

In 1992, he accepted an offer to ride in Hong Kong for trainer Brian Kan Ping-chee. After five successful years, he switched to riding for trainer David Hill and then in 1999 with Tony Cruz with whom he earned numerous Group One wins most notably aboard the three-time World Champion Sprinter, Silent Witness.

References

 The Big Interview special feature by Mark Anthony on Felix Coetzee at SAHorseRacing.com (Retrieved 11 April 2007)
 Felix Coetzee profile at the Hong Kong Jockey Club

1959 births
Living people
Afrikaner people
South African people of Dutch descent
Sportspeople from Durban
South African jockeys